The 1884 Harvard Crimson football team represented Harvard University in the 1884 college football season. They finished with a 7–4 record.

On November 15, Harvard lost to Princeton by a 36–6 score before 3,000 spectators at Jarvis Field in Cambridge.

On November 22, Harvard lost to Yale by a 51–0 score before 2,400 spectators at the new athletic grounds in New Haven. The game was played in two halves of 45 minutes with a 15-minute intermission.

Schedule

References

Harvard
Harvard Crimson football seasons
Harvard Crimson football